Sangeetha Thanapal (born  1983) is a Singaporean social critic and political activist.

Political views
Thanapal has written prolifically on race relations in Singapore. She uses the term "Chinese privilege" to describe Chinese hegemony in Singapore, defining it "similarly to white privilege". According to Thanapal, "By virtue of being Chinese in Singapore, you start life at a higher place compared to minorities." 

In August 2015, she wrote on Facebook that Minister for Law and Foreign Affairs K. Shanmugam was an "Islamophobic bigot who thinks Malay-Muslims are a threat"; she later apologised to Shanmugam for her "unruly" remarks and took down her post.

In April 2018, she wrote on Facebook that Singapore was a "terribly racist country" and a "Chinese supremacist state".

In January 2019, the Singapore police issued her a stern warning for "promoting enmity between different groups on grounds of religion or race" under Section 298A of the country's penal code. Thanapal described her encounter with the police as "very traumatising" and temporarily deactivated her Facebook page.

Personal life
Thanapal was raised in Singapore by a single mother of Tamil ethnicity and attended the University of Sussex. She moved to Melbourne, Australia in 2016.

References

External links
 

Singaporean people
Singaporean people of Indian descent
1980s births
Living people